The Thomas & Mack Center is a multi-purpose arena located on the campus of the University of Nevada, Las Vegas in Paradise, Nevada. It is home of the UNLV Runnin' Rebels basketball team of the Mountain West Conference.

History
The facility was first opened in the summer of 1983. The gala grand opening was held on December 16, 1983, featuring Frank Sinatra, Dean Martin and Diana Ross. The facility hosts numerous events, such as concerts, music festivals, conventions and boxing cards. For ring events, the capacity is 19,522; for basketball, the capacity is 18,000. The facility is named after two prominent Nevada bankers, E. Parry Thomas and Jerome D. Mack, who donated the original funds for the feasibility and land studies.

The arena underwent a major interior and exterior renovation in 1999. 2008 saw the installation of all new visual equipment, which included a 4-sided new center-hung LED widescreen scoreboard, which includes four LED advertising/scoring boards above it and a LED advertising ring below it to replace the one installed in 1995, a partial LED ring beam display covering 80% of the balcony's rim, a new 50' LED scorer's table display, a new shot clock system for the backboards, six wall-mounted locker room game clocks, two new custom scoreboards with fixed digital scoring and complete player stats and a new outdoor marquee LED video billboard.

In 2001, a smaller arena, Cox Pavilion, was added to the complex; the two arenas are directly connected. Cox Pavilion is used for smaller events; its main tenants are the UNLV women's basketball and volleyball programs.

The center's primary tenant is the UNLV men's basketball team since 1983. The arena was nicknamed "the Shark Tank" after UNLV coach Jerry Tarkanian, whose nickname was Tark the Shark. He won a national championship in 1990 and took the team to three additional Final Fours (four Final Fours overall). The arena ranked 4th highest in college basketball attendance during the 2012-2013 season.

The facility also hosted the Las Vegas Thunder of the now defunct International Hockey League. It was also host of the Los Angeles Lakers pre-season games annually in October through 2013. In 2014 and 2015 their games were played at MGM Grand, and from 2016 onward at T-Mobile Arena.

Arena Football
It was the former home of the Arena Football League's Las Vegas Sting, Las Vegas Gladiators, and Las Vegas Outlaws. In 2005 and 2006, the arena hosted the Arena Football League's ArenaBowl.

ArenaBowl XIX and ArenaBowl XX were the first two ArenaBowls to be held at a neutral site arena. In the past, the games had been played at the site of the highest seed in the playoffs.

In ArenaBowl XIX in 2005, the Colorado Crush, owned by John Elway defeated the Georgia Force on a field goal on the final play of the game. The game was ranked as one of the AFL's 20 best games ever in league history. The following year, 2006, the Chicago Rush, owned by Mike Ditka defeated the Orlando Predators 69-61 for the Rush's first championship in franchise history.

Basketball

NBA
The venue hosted the 2007 NBA All-Star Game, marking the first time that this game was held in a city without a National Basketball Association (NBA) franchise. For the first time in NBA history, an on-campus college sports arena served as venue of an NBA All-Star Game. However, the arena had previously hosted home games for two NBA teams, the Utah Jazz and Los Angeles Lakers.

The Utah Jazz used the arena in the mid-1980s, and it was where Kareem Abdul-Jabbar broke Wilt Chamberlain's record for points in a career in 1984. The Lakers used the arena in 1992 for Game 4 of their first round playoff series against the Portland Trail Blazers, which Portland won 102–76. The NBA moved the game as a result of the Los Angeles riots.

College
The 1994-95 Big West Conference, 1997–99 Western Athletic Conference and 2000-03 Mountain West Conference men's basketball tournaments were held there as well. The Mountain West Conference basketball tournament returned in 2007 and stayed until 2013.

International
The FIBA Americas Championship 2007 was held at Thomas & Mack Center from August 22 to September 2.

Rodeo
In late 2007, CBS filmed part of the CSI: Crime Scene Investigation episode, "Bull", at the Thomas & Mack Center, which was hosting the PBR World Finals.
Since 1985, the Thomas & Mack Center has hosted the National Finals Rodeo annually each December. It also hosted the PBR World Finals from 1999 to 2015 before the event moved to the new T-Mobile Arena from the 2016 season onward; the PBR returned in 2018 to host their annual "Last Cowboy Standing" event. As a surprise during the 2018 PBR World Finals in November, CEO Sean Gleason announced that the PBR Last Cowboy Standing event would be hosted at Cheyenne Frontier Days in Cheyenne, Wyoming starting in 2019. This move to the world's largest outdoor rodeo expanded on a growing partnership.

Martial arts
The venue hosted multiple professional boxing fights, including:

 September 12, 1992 - Julio César Chávez vs Hector "Macho" Camacho (for the WBC light welterweight title)
 November 13, 1992 - Evander Holyfield vs. Riddick Bowe (for the WBA, WBC, IBF and lineal heavyweight titles)
 May 8, 1993 - Lennox Lewis vs. Tony Tucker (for the WBC heavyweight title)
 June 13, 1993 - George Foreman vs. Tommy Morrison (for the WBO heavyweight title)
 April 12, 1997 - Pernell Whitaker vs. Oscar De La Hoya (for the WBC and lineal welterweight titles)
 September 13, 1997 - Oscar De La Hoya vs. Héctor Camacho (for the WBC and lineal welterweight titles)
 November 8, 1997 - Evander Holyfield vs. Michael Moorer II (for the WBA and IBF heavyweight titles)
 September 18, 1998 - Oscar De La Hoya vs. Julio César Chávez II (for the WBC and lineal welterweight title)
 November 13, 1999 - Evander Holyfield vs. Lennox Lewis II (for the WBA, WBC, IBF and lineal heavyweight titles)
 March 1, 2003 - John Ruiz vs. Roy Jones Jr. (for the WBA heavyweight title)
 January 21, 2006 - Érik Morales vs. Manny Pacquiao II (for the WBC International super featherweight title)
 April 8, 2006 - Floyd Mayweather Jr. vs. Zab Judah (for the IBF and IBO welterweight titles)
 November 18, 2006 - Manny Pacquiao vs. Érik Morales III (for the WBC International super featherweight title)
 April 19, 2008 - Bernard Hopkins vs. Joe Calzaghe (light heavyweight fight)
 September 15, 2012 - Julio César Chávez Jr. vs Sergio Martínez (for the WBC middleweight title)
 October 13, 2013 - Timothy Bradley vs. Juan Manuel Márquez (for the WBO welterweight title)
 November 5, 2016 - Manny Pacquiao vs. Jessie Vargas (for the WBO welterweight title)

The venue also hosted mixed martial arts events such as UFC 43 in 2003, Pride 32 in 2006 and Pride 33 in 2007.

Other sports events
On March 30, 1984, the USA Volleyball Olympic team competed in the international competition at Thomas & Mack Center.

Numerous WWE PPV events have been held at the Thomas and Mack Center including No Way Out (2001), Vengeance (2005), No Way Out (2008), and the finals of the all women's Mae Young Classic (2017) tournament, as well as episodes of WWE Raw, WWE SmackDown, WWE ECW, WWE Heat, WWE Velocity, WWE Superstars, WWE NXT, WWE Main Event and WWE Superstars of Wrestling.

Other events
The facility also hosts numerous other events, such as concerts, music festivals and conventions.

The gala grand opening was held on December 16, 1983, featuring Frank Sinatra, Dean Martin and Diana Ross.
Rock band Mötley Crüe performed on March 16, 1984.

Sir Elton John's first performance at the arena was on August 24, 1984.

Other bands such as AC/DC, Van Halen, Metallica, Kiss, and Aerosmith performed in 1986.

On November 14, 1987, comedian Eddie Murphy performed at the arena.

On January 25, 1992, Guns N' Roses performed at the arena during their Use Your Illusion Tour. It was the largest attendance single performance concert with 17,590 fans in attendance. Later, the record was broken by U2 on November 18, 2001 when U2 sold 17,771 tickets.
 
Pearl Jam performed at the arena on July 11, 1998.

Rock band Phish performed at the arena 10 times. The first time on November 13, 1997 as their Fall tour opener. They also played on October 30 and 31, 1998.  During the Halloween Night performance, the band covered The Velvet Underground's "Loaded" album in its entirety during the second set.  This performance is available on the band's official live release Live Phish Volume 16.  The band returned to the arena for two shows in September 2000 on the 29th and 30th and again for two more shows in February 2003 on the 15th and 16th. They also played three shows in 2004 on April 15, 16 and 17th.

On September 11, 2003, Thomas & Mack Center celebrated its 20th anniversary, hosting R.E.M. in concert.

In September 2004, the World Music Awards was held at the arena, broadcast live on ABC.

On January 28, 2007, High School Musical: The Concert performed with over 10,000 people attending.

The arena has hosted lectures by Bill Clinton and Mikhail Gorbachev as part of various UNLV-affiliated lecture series.

On October 19, 2016, the arena hosted the final Presidential Debate for the 2016 presidential election.

On June 15, 2022 Dave Matthews Band performed for the culmination of the 2022 Cisco Live! conference. 

On July 22-24, 2022, Monster Jam made its debut at the arena. This marked the show's first trip to Las Vegas since the 2019 All-Star Challenge at Sam Boyd Stadium.

Gallery

See also
 List of NCAA Division I basketball arenas

References

External links

 
 Arena Tickets

 
 
1983 establishments in Nevada
Event venues established in 1983
Sports venues completed in 1983
Basketball venues in Nevada
Boxing venues in Las Vegas
College basketball venues in the United States
Indoor arenas in Las Vegas
Indoor ice hockey venues in the United States
Indoor soccer venues in the United States
Mixed martial arts venues in Nevada
Rodeo venues in the United States
Show jumping venues in the United States
Sports venues in Las Vegas
UNLV Runnin' Rebels basketball
Utah Jazz venues
Las Vegas Flash